Robert David Shields, known professionally as ONR, is a Scottish singer and songwriter currently signed to Warner Records.

Early life and career
ONR. is originally from Renfrewshire, but has spent most of his life living in Dumfries and Galloway, Scotland. As a teenager in 2005, he signed a publishing deal in Los Angeles, set up his own record label, and released an album. He would later form a band called Finding Albert, and composed music for various film and television projects including Sky Sports. In mid-2016, he began releasing music under the ONR. moniker through the Los Angeles indie label, Leftwing. Soon after, he signed a record deal with Capitol Records.

Early on, he received support from LA radio stations, KCRW and KCSN. He released his first major label single, "Jericho," in August 2017 and played the main stage at the Electric Fields Festival soon after.

He released his second single "5 Years Time," in November 2017. He followed that with the release of "American Gods" in February 2018.

He signed to Warner Records in 2019.  In August 2020, ONR released "Kill TV" on Warner Records which featured legendary guitarist and producer Nile Rodgers. The two struck up a friendship after meeting at Abbey Road Studios. Rodgers said of working with ONR "it was almost like Daft Punk, I played one song and after they were like, 'well, here's another one and here's another one'... after 'Kill TV' I said, 'Wow, this guy has really got something.'" 

ONR has toured across Europe with artists including Bastille, Jake Bugg, Lewis Capaldi and Mondo Cozmo.

Discography

EPs

Singles

As featured artist

References

External links
Official website

Warner Records artists
21st-century Scottish male singers
Scottish singer-songwriters
Scottish pop singers
People from Dumfries
British male singer-songwriters